Nikki Stringfield (born 1990) is an American heavy metal musician. She is the current guitarist for both The Iron Maidens and Femme Fatale, the current touring guitarist for Heaven Below, as well as the former guitarist for Before the Mourning.

Early life 
Born in 1990 in Red Oak, Texas, Stringfield attended Red Oak High School and graduated in 2008. She studied at The University of Texas in Austin, graduating in 2012 with a degree in Radio/TV/Film.

Career 
After an internship with Warner Brothers Music Stringfield moved to Los Angeles in January 2012 and became part of American melodic metal bands Before the Mourning and The Iron Maidens.

In 2014, Stringfield and Before the Mourning parted ways, after which time Stringfield joined Femme Fatale in May 2015. In September 2015, The Iron Maidens brought the former guest guitarist on as a settled member for the ensemble. Stringfield and The Iron Maidens vocalist Kirsten Rosenberg appeared as contestants on the August 3, 2017, episode of the music game show Beat Shazam.

In 2017, Stringfield released music videos for her solo singles "Save Our Souls" and "As Chaos Consumes", followed by "Heart Shaped Box" in 2018.

In late 2018, Stringfield became a touring guitarist for American rock band Heaven Below. In January 2019, she announced that she plans to release her debut solo EP some time that year. In July 2019, the singer announced the title of the album, Harmonies for the Haunted, with a September 2019 announcement that she expects to release the album on October 30, 2019. On October 18, 2019, Stringfield debuted "When the Devil Comes Down", her first single from the EP.

In March 2021, the singer announced that she is working on a full-length studio album.

On Sundays in February 2022, Stringfield and Heaven Below lead vocalist/Lita Ford guitarist Patrick Kennison performed during their residency at Hard Rock Cafe in Hollywood, California.

On 26 June 2022, Stringfield plans to release Live in the Living Room which she created with Kennison.  The two plan to perform that same date at Hard Rock Cafe in Hollywood, California.

Additionally, on the last 3 Wednesdays in July 2022, Stringfield plans to perform at the same venue, with Kennison performing on the latter two dates.

Discography

Before the Mourning

EPs 
 Remembrance (2012)
 Damned and Forsaken (2014)

Videos 
 "Before the Mourning" (2012)

Solo career

Studio albums 
 Live in the Living Room (with Patrick Kennison)(2022)
 Apocrypha  (2022)

EPs 
 Harmonies for the Haunted (2019)

Singles 
 "Sally's Song" (2016)
 "As Chaos Consumes" (2017)
 "Save Our Souls" (2017)
 "Heart Shaped Box" (2018)
 "When the Devil Comes Down"

References 

Guitarists from Texas
Musicians from Dallas
Living people
Singers from Texas
1990 births
21st-century American women guitarists